Kasapovići (Cyrillic: Касаповићи) is a village in the City of Zenica, Bosnia and Herzegovina. The population was 494 at the 2013 census.

Demographics 
According to the 2013 census, its population was 266.

References

Populated places in Zenica